The 1999 Italian Grand Prix (formally the 70º Gran Premio Campari d'Italia) was a Formula One motor race held on 12 September 1999 at the Autodromo Nazionale di Monza near Monza, Italy. It was the thirteenth race of the 1999 Formula One World Championship, and the last held on this layout.

The 53-lap race was won by Heinz-Harald Frentzen, driving a Jordan-Mugen-Honda, after McLaren's Mika Häkkinen, seeking to defend his Drivers' Championship title, spun off while leading comfortably. Ralf Schumacher was second in a Williams-Supertec, with Mika Salo third in a Ferrari. Häkkinen's rival Eddie Irvine finished sixth in the other Ferrari, thus moving level on points with the Finn at the top of the Drivers' Championship.

Though the victory moved Frentzen to within ten points of Häkkinen and Irvine, it would turn out to be his third and last victory in Formula One, as well as the last for engine suppliers Mugen. It was also the Jordan team's only victory in dry conditions, their others coming in the rain.

Report

Qualifying
Going into the race, McLaren's Mika Häkkinen led the Drivers' Championship by a single point from Ferrari's Eddie Irvine, with Jordan's Heinz-Harald Frentzen and Häkkinen's team-mate David Coulthard also still in contention. Häkkinen was expected to do well on the fast Monza circuit, and duly claimed pole position by half a second from Frentzen. Coulthard was third, while Alessandro Zanardi, who had been having a poor year with Williams, was fourth, just ahead of teammate Ralf Schumacher. On Ferrari's home soil, Irvine had a poor qualifying session and could only manage eighth, behind teammate Mika Salo in sixth and Stewart's Rubens Barrichello – who had just signed with Ferrari to replace Irvine in  – in seventh. Completing the top ten were Damon Hill in the second Jordan and Olivier Panis in the Prost.

Race
At the start, Häkkinen led away while Zanardi shot past Coulthard and Frentzen into second. Frentzen quickly re-passed Zanardi, but Coulthard fell further back, behind Schumacher and Salo. Meanwhile, at the back of the field, Minardi's Marc Gené tangled with Arrows' Pedro de la Rosa at the Roggia chicane and became the first retirement, while on the second lap Benetton's Giancarlo Fisichella and Sauber's Pedro Diniz both spun off at the Rettifilo chicane.

On lap 3, Zanardi ran over a kerb and damaged the underside of his car. He managed to hold on to third place for another 15 laps, while Häkkinen and Frentzen pulled away. Barrichello passed Coulthard on lap 11 and then Salo on lap 19, while Zanardi waved Schumacher past on lap 18. On lap 24, there was more drama at the back as Toranosuke Takagi in the second Arrows tried to overtake Luca Badoer in the second Minardi at the Rettifilo, only to run into the back of Badoer and end his race.

Barrichello overtook Zanardi on lap 26; Salo did the same at the start of lap 28. At this point, Häkkinen led Frentzen by eight seconds, with Schumacher a further two-and-a-half seconds back. But on lap 30, going into the Rettifilo, Häkkinen made a mistake changing gear – selecting first instead of second – and spun off, in a virtual repeat of his unforced error at San Marino earlier in the year. In a rare show of emotion, the Finn burst into tears at the side of the track.

Frentzen thus inherited the lead as the front-runners began to make their pit stops. When these had been completed, Salo had moved back ahead of Barrichello and into third, while Coulthard and Irvine had both leapfrogged Zanardi and were now fifth and sixth.

Over the closing laps, Frentzen retained a comfortable lead over Schumacher – despite the Williams driver setting the fastest lap of the race on lap 48 – while Coulthard tried unsuccessfully to find a way past Barrichello, allowing Salo to pull away from both of them. Frentzen's eventual margin of victory was 3.2 seconds, with a further eight seconds back to Salo and another six back to Barrichello. Coulthard finished half a second behind the Stewart driver, but nine ahead of Irvine, who himself held off Zanardi for the final point.

This point moved Irvine level with Häkkinen in the Drivers' Championship on 60 points apiece, while the win put Frentzen just ten points behind on 50, with Coulthard on 48. In the Constructors' Championship, Ferrari cut McLaren's lead to six points, 108 to 102.

Classification

Qualifying

Race

Championship standings after the race

Drivers' Championship standings

Constructors' Championship standings

References 

Italian Grand Prix
Italian Grand Prix
Grand Prix
September 1999 sports events in Europe